Ilya Alekseevich Shatrov (April 1, 1879 (or 1885) - May 2, 1952) was a Russian military musician, conductor and composer, known for composing the waltz On the Hills of Manchuria in 1906, recounting his experiences at the Battle of Mukden during the Russo-Japanese War, which he dedicated to one of his comrades fallen at the battle.

Biography
Shatrov was born in Zemlyansk, Semilukskiy, Voronezh Oblast, Russia on 1 April 1879 to Aleksej Mihajlovich Shatrov, a retired non-commissioned officer of the Lithuanian Life Guards Infantry Regiment of the Russian Imperial Guard.

In 1905, Shatrov became the bandmaster of the Mokshansky Regimental Orchestra and served in the Russo-Japanese war. In February 1905, the 214th Reserve Mokshan Infantry Regiment took part in the Battle of Mukden and Liaoyang. In one of the battles the regiment was surrounded by the Japanese and was constantly attacked by the enemy. At a critical moment, when the ammunition was already spent, the regiment commander Colonel Pavel Pobyvanets gave the order: "The banner and the orchestra will go ahead!" Kapellmeister Shatrov led the orchestra to the parapet of the trenches, gave the order to play a battle march and led the orchestra ahead of the regiment's banner. Encouraged soldiers rushed into the bayonet attack. During the battle, the regiment, with the music of the orchestra, continuously attacked the Japanese and, in the end, broke through the encirclement. In the course of the battle the regiment commander perished, and of the original 4000 members of the regiment only 700 people, including 7 musicians of the orchestra, were left alive. For this feat, all the survivor musicians of the orchestra were awarded with crosses of St. George, Shatrov - an officer order of Saint Stanislav 3rd class with swords (the second such awarding of the conductors), and the orchestra was awarded silver pipes.

He died in Tambov on 2 May 1952. He was buried at Vozdvizhensky Cemetery.

Works
On the Hills of Manchuria
It's Raining

References

External links

Russian composers
Russian male composers
Soviet composers
Soviet male composers
Russian military musicians
Military personnel of the Russian Empire
Soviet Army officers
20th-century Russian male musicians
Russian people of the Russo-Japanese War